Olivancillaria orbignyi, common name Ureta's olive, is a species of sea snail, a marine gastropod mollusk in the family Olividae, the olives.

Description
The length of the shell varies between 24 mm and 35 mm.

Distribution
This species occurs in the Atlantic Ocean from Brazil to Argentina.

References

 Marrat, F. P. 1868. On Oliva auricularia, Lam., O. aquatilis, Reeve, and O. auricularia D'Orb.. Annals and Magazine of Natural History (4)2: 167–168. 
 Klappenbach M.A. (1965). Consideraciones sobre el genero Olivancillaria d'Orbigny 1840 (Moll.Gastr.) y descripcion de dos nuevas especies de aguas Argentinas y Uruguayas. Com.Zool.Mus.His.Nat.Montevideo 8(104
 Teso V. & Pastorino G. (2011) A revision of the genus Olivancillaria (Mollusca: Olividae) from the southwestern Atlantic. Zootaxa 2889: 1–34. [

External links
 Gastropods.com: Olivancillaria uretai

Olividae
Gastropods described in 1868